Auxigro is a growth-enhancer that is approved in the United States by the United States Environmental Protection Agency for spray on fruits, vegetables, and grains. It is a mixture of equal parts gamma-aminobutyric acid (GABA), casein hydrolysate and glutamic acid dissolved in water.

External links 

 Patent: "Method to mitigate plant stress"
 Patent: "Methods of treating plants with glycolic acid"

Agricultural chemicals